Tekfen Tower is a skyscraper located in Levent, Istanbul, Turkey. The skyscraper has 28 floors

External links 
 Emporis

Buildings and structures completed in 2002
Skyscrapers in Istanbul
2002 establishments in Turkey
21st-century architecture in Turkey